is a passenger railway station in the city of Toride, Ibaraki Prefecture, Japan operated by the private railway company Kantō Railway.

Lines

Station layout
The station consists of two elevated opposed side platforms, connected by an underpass, with a ground-level station building.

Platforms

Adjacent stations

History
Togashira Station was opened on 26 March 1975.

Passenger statistics
In fiscal 2018, the station was used by an average of 4372 passengers daily (boarding passengers only).

Surrounding area
Togashira Danchi
Moriya-Izumino New Town

See also
 List of railway stations in Japan

References

External links

  Kantō Railway Station Information 

Railway stations in Ibaraki Prefecture
Railway stations in Japan opened in 1975
Toride, Ibaraki